Kenny G Live is the first live album by saxophonist Kenny G. It was released by Arista Records in 1989, and peaked at number 2 on the Contemporary Jazz Albums chart and number 16 on the Billboard 200.
This album was recorded live at both Humphrey's Concerts By The Bay in San Diego, California. and also at the Seattle Center Opera House.

Track listing 

"Going Home" (Kenny G/Walter Afanasieff) - 5:29
"Sade" (Kenny G) - 5:49
"Silhouette" (Kenny G) - 9:17
"Midnight Motion" (Kenny G) - 8:23
"Home" (Kenny G) - 5:14
"Don't Make Me Wait for Love" (Lead vocal: Michael Bolton) (Narada Michael Walden/Preston Glass/Walter Afanasieff) - 7:13
"I've Been Missin' You" (Kashif/Kenny G) - 4:17
"Esther" (Kenny G/Lloyd Pianka) - 5:36
"Tribeca" (Kashif/Kenny G/Wayne Brathwaite) - 6:44
"Songbird" (Kenny G) - 10:38
"Uncle Al" (Kenny G/Lou Pardini) - 4:35

DVD 

"Sade"
"Silhouette"
"Midnight Motion"
"Uncle Al"
"Brogan" (Duet with Dudley Moore)
"Against Doctor's Orders"
"Esther"
"Don't Make Me Wait For Love" (Duet with Michael Bolton)
"Going Home"
"Tribeca"
"Songbird"

Musicians 
 Kenny G – saxophones, all instruments (1)
 Walter Afanasieff – all instruments (1), additional keyboards (11)
 Robert Damper – keyboards (2-10)
 Lou Pardini – keyboards (11), drum programming (11)
 John Raymond – guitars (2-10)
 Vail Johnson – bass (2-10)
 John Keane – additional drums
 Bruce Carter – drums (2-5, 7, 10)
 Rayford Griffin – live drums (11)
 Paulinho da Costa – percussion (11)
 Michael Bolton – lead vocals (6)

Production 
 Kenny G – producer 
 Mick Guzauski – engineer, mixing
 Trueman "Monty" Montfort – live show engineer
 Kevin Becka – additional engineer
 Gerry Brown – additional engineer
 Steve Smart – additional engineer
 Frank Wolfe – additional engineer
 Susan Mendola – art direction, design 
 Rose Shoshana – photography 
 Turner Management Group, Inc. – management
Studios
 Track 1 recorded at Studio G (Seattle, WA).
 Tracks 2–5, 7 & 10 recorded live at The Seattle Center Opera House (Seattle, WA); Remote recording by Turtle Recording.
 Tracks 6, 8 & 9 recorded live at Humphrey's Concerts By The Bay (San Diego, CA); Remote recording by Record Plant.
 Track 11 recorded at Westlake Audio (Los Angeles, CA) and Juniper Studios (Glendale, CA); Mixed at Conway Studios (Hollywood, CA).

Charts

Weekly charts

Year-end charts

Singles 
Information taken from this source.

Certifications

References 

Kenny G albums
1989 live albums
Arista Records live albums